Matwé Middelkoop and Boy Westerhof are the defending champions, but chose not to participate this year.

Ariel Behar and Eduardo Dischinger won the title defeating, after Aslan Karatsev and Andrey Kuznetsov retired in the final.

Seeds

Draw

External links
 Main Draw

Sport 1 Open - Doubles